Tydeus eriophyes is a species of mite belonging to the family Tydeidae. This small oval, eyeless mite is around 300 μm in length with a soft body covered in striations. It can be distinguished from similar species by the bluntly pointed, rod-like dorsal setae. This species is associated with the gall mite Eriophyes vitis on grapevines in the vicinity of Grabouw, South Africa.

References
New species of mites of the families Tydeidae and Labidostommidae (Acarina: Prostigmata) collected from South African plants Magdelena K.P. Meyer & P.A.J. Ryke Acarologia vol I

Trombidiformes
Animals described in 1959
Arthropods of South Africa